Sheikh Abdur Rahim (1859 – 14 July 1931) was a Bengali writer and journalist.

Early life 
Rahim was born in 1859 in Muhammadpur, Basirhat, 24-Parganas in the then British India. His mother died at a young age and he was subsequently raised by Radhamadhav Basu. Basu was the Zamindar of Taki and a Deputy Magistrate. Rahim studied at a school in Taki and went to High School in Kolkata. He could not complete his education as a result of contracting smallpox.

Career
Rahim was very aware of Bengali Muslim community's wealth and history. He edited Sudhakar in 1889 and Islam Pracharak in 1891. He would also go on to work for Mihir, Mihir O Sudhakar, Moslem Bharat, Moslem Hitaisi Hafez, and Islam-Darshan. He was a member of the Bangiya Mussalman Sahitya Samiti, Calcutta Central Textbook Committee, Calcutta Mohammedan Union, and Bangiya Sahitya Parishad. He was an entrance examiner of Bengali language at the University of Calcutta.

Bibliography
 Hazrat Muhammader Jibon Chorito O Dharmaniti (1887)
 Islam Etibritto (1910)
 Islam Neeti-1 (1925)
 Islam Neeti-2 (1927)
 Quran O Hadither Upodeshaboli (1926)
 Namajtotto Ba Namaj Bishoyok Juktimala (1898)
 Hajjbidhi (1903)
 Rojatotto (1928)
 Khotba (1932)
 Islamer Totto

Death 
Rahim died on 14 July 1931 in his own village.

References

External links
 

1859 births
1931 deaths
People from North 24 Parganas district
Bengali writers
Indian male writers
Bengali-language writers
Bengali Muslim scholars of Islam
20th-century Bengalis
19th-century Bengalis
Writers from West Bengal

Bengali Muslims